Basle, 1969 (also released as Live on Tour Switzerland) is a big band jazz album recorded by the Thad Jones/Mel Lewis Jazz Orchestra in Basle (Basel), Switzerland for a Swiss radio broadcast. It was not released until 1996 – as Volume 4 of TCB Music's "Swiss Radio Days" series.

Track listing
 "Second Race" – 10:53
 "Don't Ever Leave Me" – 4:29
 "The Waltz You Swang For Me" – 9:23
 "A- That's Freedom" (Hank Jones) – 11:09
 "Come Sunday" (Duke Ellington) – 4:55
 "Don't Get Sassy" – 11:48
 "Bible Story" (Roland Hanna) – 6:47
 "Groove Merchant" (Jerome Richardson) – 8:22

All songs arranged by Thad Jones.  All songs composed by Jones except as noted.

Personnel
 Thad Jones – flugelhorn
 Mel Lewis – drums
 Roland Hanna – piano
 Richard Davis – bass
 Jerome Richardson – alto saxophone, soprano saxophone
 Jerry Dodgion – alto saxophone
 Joe Henderson – tenor saxophone
 Eddie Daniels – tenor saxophone
 Pepper Adams – baritone saxophone
 Snooky Young – trumpet
 Richard Williams – trumpet
 Danny Moore – trumpet
 Al Porcino – trumpet
 Jimmy Knepper – trombone
 Ashley Fannell – trombone
 Eddie Bert – trombone
 Cliff Heather – trombone

References

External links
 TCB Music 2042
 [ Allmusic]
Bowers, Jack. Review at allaboutjazz.com Accessed 2008 April 26.

1996 live albums
The Thad Jones/Mel Lewis Orchestra live albums